Shibleys Point is an unincorporated community in Adair County, Missouri, United States.

History
Shibleys Point is named for the Shibley family of pioneer settlers, who settled there circa 1840. A post office called Shibley's Point was established in 1855, and remained in operation until 1908.

References

Unincorporated communities in Adair County, Missouri
Unincorporated communities in Missouri